The Town Clock, also sometimes called the Old Town Clock or Citadel Clock Tower, is a clock tower located at Fort George in the urban core of Halifax, the capital city of Nova Scotia.

History

Prince Edward, Duke of Kent, the commander-in-chief of the military forces of British North America, is credited with the idea of a clock for the British Army and Royal Navy garrison at Halifax, to resolve tardiness in the garrison. He arranged for a turret clock to be manufactured before his return to England in 1800.

The clock tower is a three-tiered (three storey), irregular octagon tower built atop a one-storey white clapboard building of classic Palladian proportions.  It was erected on the east slope of Citadel Hill facing Barrack (now Brunswick) Street. The clock face is 4-sided, displaying Roman numerals. As with most clocks the "4" is shown as IIII for aesthetic symmetry and not as IV.

The clock mechanism was constructed by the "House of Vulliamy", respected Royal Clockmakers based in London.  It is driven by three weights, gears, and a 13-foot pendulum with the mechanism being housed in a cast iron frame located in the "clock room", immediately below the belfry.  Its bell strikes hourly and quarterly and the durability of the mechanism (which dates to the original installation) is attributed to its slow movement.

The Town Clock began keeping time for the garrison on October 20, 1803.

The tower housing the Town Clock has been used in the past as a guard room and as a residence for the clock caretaker. The first caretaker of the Citadel Clock had the surname Dechman. Restoration work on the Town Clock has taken place at various times during the 20th century, with the property passing into the care of Parks Canada, which has responsibility for the Citadel Hill National Historic Site.  The caretaker position ceased in 1965 with its maintenance now being performed by Citadel Hill employees, who wind the clock mechanism twice weekly.

A major restoration project in 1960 saw the exterior façade of the Town Clock building returned to its original Georgian appearance and roof replaced due to water damage. George Rose, a parks employee recorded this restoration. Another restoration was carried out in 2005 to restore the clock's faces. New copper roofing and restored clock face/hands were done in 2018.

As a Halifax icon, the Town Clock has featured in many artworks, fictional and non-fictional accounts of Halifax. One among many is a depiction of the town clock as a character named Chimey in the children's television show Theodore Tugboat.

References

External links
 Parks Canada, Halifax Citadel National Historic Site - The Town Clock

See also 
List of oldest buildings and structures in Halifax, Nova Scotia

Buildings and structures in Halifax, Nova Scotia
Clock towers in Canada
Terminating vistas in Canada
Tourist attractions in Halifax County, Nova Scotia
Octagonal buildings in Canada
Towers completed in 1803
Georgian architecture in Canada